This is a list of Theta Phi Alpha alumnae and honorary alumnae.

Entertainment

Fashion icons

Political figures

Business

Authors

Civic and/or philanthropic leaders

References

sisters
Lists of members of United States student societies